Larnaca International Airport – Glafcos Clerides  is an international airport located  southwest of Larnaca, Cyprus. Larnaca International Airport is Cyprus' main international gateway and the larger of the two commercial airports in the area controlled by the Republic of Cyprus, the other being Paphos International Airport on the island's southwestern coast. The airport was given its current name in July 2016, in honour of former President of Cyprus (1993 – 2003) Glafcos Clerides.

History
Larnaca Airport was hastily developed towards the end of 1974 after the invasion of Cyprus by Turkey on 20 July of the same year, which forced the closure of the Nicosia International Airport. The site on which it was built (near the Larnaca Salt Lake) had been previously used as an airfield in the 1930s and, subsequently, as a military installation by British forces. Larnaca International opened on 8 February 1975, with only limited infrastructure facilities and a prefabricated set of buildings comprising separate halls for departures and arrivals. The first airlines to use the new airport were Cyprus Airways, using Viscount 800s leased from British Midland, and Olympic Airways, using NAMC YS-11s. Initially, the runway at Larnaca International was too short for jet aircraft.

Operations
The status of Cyprus as a major tourist destination means that air traffic has steadily risen to over 5 million passengers a year. This is double the capacity the airport was first designed for. For this reason, a tender was put out in 1998 to develop the airport further and increase its capacity (see below). Already completed elements of the expansion include a new control tower, fire station, runway extension, and additional administrative offices. The surrounding road network was improved by upgrading the B4 road; a new junction has been constructed near the new terminal. The old terminal building is slated to be partially demolished and refurbished as a cargo centre, and is currently used as a private terminal for visiting heads of state, other VIPs, and private aircraft operators.

The airport's geographic location in-between Europe, Africa, Russia and the Middle East facilitates it as an airline hub for traffic and flight operations between these locations. It currently holds domestic, regional and international passenger and cargo services by over 50 airlines. Notably, Gulf Air used to provide a non-stop service to New York-JFK twice a week.

Romanian low-cost carrier Blue Air announced the closure of their Larnaca base in September 2020.

Facilities
The airport has one primary state-of-the-art passenger terminal. Departures are accommodated on the upper level, while arrivals are accommodated at the ground level. The old terminal serves as a "VIP terminal", which is used for visiting heads of state, some private aviation, and for cargo. The airport utilises a single large apron for all passenger aircraft. The concept architectural design of the passenger terminal was developed by French architects at Aéroports de Paris (ADP) with Sofréavia in France.

A €650 million upgrade of the Larnaca and Paphos airports was completed in 2006. The international tender was won by Hermes Airports, a French-led group. The consortium is made up of Bouygues Batiment International (22%) Egis Projects (20%), the Cyprus Trading Corporation (a local retail group-10%), Iacovou Brothers (a local contractor-10%), Hellenic Mining (10%), Vancouver Airport Services (10%), Ireland's Dublin Airport Authority (Aer Rianta International) (10%), Charilaos Apostolides (a local construction company-5%) and Nice Côte d'Azur Airport (3%). Hermes Airports built new passenger terminals and plans to extend the runways at both airports under a 25-year concession.

A new terminal building opened on 7 November 2009. It has 16 jetways (boarding bridges), 67 check-in counters, 8 self check-in kiosks, 48 departure gates, and 2,450 parking spots. The new terminal can handle 7.5 million passengers per year. Infrastructure also features a large engineering hangar, a cargo terminal, and separate facilities for fuelling and provisioning light aircraft. There is a second, smaller apron where cargo aircraft and private aircraft are often parked. There are also spaces for smaller aircraft for flying schools and privately owned aircraft separate from the main two aprons.

Airlines and destinations

Passenger

The following airlines operate regular scheduled and charter flights to and from Larnaca:

Cargo

Statistics

Access
The airport can be reached by car, taxi and public transport system. There is a shuttle bus system from/to Limassol, Nicosia, Protaras, Paralimni and Ayia Napa. Local buses are available at the airport to various locations in Larnaca.

Incidents and accidents
 On 13 October 1977, Lufthansa Flight 181, flying from Palma de Mallorca to Frankfurt, with 91 passengers and crew was hijacked by four Popular Front for the Liberation of Palestine (PFLP) members, and was diverted and landed in turn at the airports in Rome, Larnaca, Bahrain, and Dubai. The Boeing 737 was then forced to fly on to Mogadishu Airport, Somalia, where a West German antiterrorist squad stormed the plane, killing three hijackers, arresting one and rescuing all passengers. The captain of the flight had previously been murdered by the lead terrorist.
 On 19 February 1978, Egyptian commandos exchanged gunfire with Cypriot special forces on the tarmac at Larnaca.  Seventeen Egyptian commandos were killed.
 On 5 April 1988, Kuwait Airways Flight 422, a Kuwait Airways Boeing 747, was hijacked, while en route from Thailand to Kuwait. After forcing the plane to fly to Iran, the hijackers forced the crew to fly the plane further west to Algeria, but the plane landed in Larnaca for refuelling. Two Kuwaiti hostages were murdered by the hijackers and their bodies were thrown out on the airport's runway. The Cypriot authorities managed to release 12 hostages; in exchange, they agreed to resupply the plane with jet fuel. The hijacking ended in Algeria on 20 April 1988.
On 29 March 2016, EgyptAir Flight 181, operated by Airbus A320-232 SU-GCB, was hijacked whilst on a flght from Borg El Arab Airport to Cairo International Airport. The aircraft landed at Larnaca. The hijacker claimed to be wearing an explosive belt, but it was later revealed to be fake.

Notes

References

External links

Official website

Airports in Cyprus
Airports established in 1974
Larnaca
1974 establishments in Cyprus